Eupithecia taiwana is a moth in the family Geometridae. It is found in Taiwan.

References

Moths described in 1917
taiwana
Moths of Taiwan